Elk Point is a city in and county seat of Union County, South Dakota, United States. The population was 2,149 as of the 2020 census.

History
The British established a Hudson's Bay Company trading post in 1755 near present-day Elk Point. Elk Point was so named on account of the abundant elk in the area. The town was incorporated in 1873.

Geography
Elk Point is located at  (42.685512, −96.681789).

Elk Point has been assigned the ZIP code 57025 and the FIPS place code 18620.

Demographics

It is part of the Sioux City, IA-NE-SD Metropolitan Statistical Area.

2010 census
As of the census of 2010, there were 1,963 people, 770 households, and 505 families living in the city. The racial makeup of the city was 97.0% White, 0.3% African American, 0.6% Native American, 0.2% Asian, 0.8% from other races, and 1.2% from two or more races. Hispanic or Latino of any race were 1.5% of the population.

There were 770 households, of which 37.5% had children under the age of 18 living with them, 51.9% were married couples living together, 8.4% had a female householder with no husband present, 5.2% had a male householder with no wife present, and 34.4% were non-families. 30.8% of all households were made up of individuals, and 15% had someone living alone who was 65 years of age or older. The average household size was 2.49 and the average family size was 3.16.

The median age in the city was 36.3 years. 30.4% of residents were under the age of 18; 4.9% were between the ages of 18 and 24; 25.7% were from 25 to 44; 25% were from 45 to 64; and 14% were 65 years of age or older. The gender makeup of the city was 48.0% male and 52.0% female.

2000 census
As of the census of 2000, there were 1,714 people, 682 households, and 459 families living in the city. The racial makeup of the city was 98.54% White, 0.18% African American, 0.23% Native American, 0.35% Asian, 0.18% from other races, and 0.53% from two or more races. Hispanic or Latino of any race were 0.93% of the population.

There were 682 households, out of which 33.6% had children under the age of 18 living with them, 56.2% were married couples living together, 7.5% had a female householder with no husband present, and 32.6% were non-families. 28.6% of all households were made up of individuals, and 14.1% had someone living alone who was 65 years of age or older. The average household size was 2.43 and the average family size was 3.00.

In the city, the population was spread out, with 26.7% under the age of 18, 8.7% from 18 to 24, 27.8% from 25 to 44, 21.4% from 45 to 64, and 15.5% who were 65 years of age or older. The median age was 36 years. For every 100 females, there were 93.5 males. For every 100 females age 18 and over, there were 90.5 males.

As of 2000, the median income for a household in the city was $41,157, and the median income for a family was $48,056. Males had a median income of $35,509 versus $22,885 for females. The per capita income for the city was $18,153. About 5.5% of families and 7.4% of the population were below the poverty line, including 8.1% of those under age 18 and 8.4% of those age 65 or over.

Education
Elk Point Public Schools are part of the Elk Point-Jefferson School District (South Dakota). The school district has one elementary school, one middle school, and one high school. Students attend Elk Point-Jefferson High School.

Notable person
 Chuck Tollefson, a football player for the Green Bay Packers.

See also
 List of cities in South Dakota

References

External links

 
 Elk Point History from the Union County Historical Society
 Article from the Argus Leader newspaper of Sioux Falls, S.D., about the Gorilla Project and Hyperion Resources

Cities in South Dakota
Cities in Union County, South Dakota
County seats in South Dakota
Sioux City metropolitan area